is a German footballer who plays as a midfielder for 2. Bundesliga club Fortuna Düsseldorf. Born in Japan, Appelkamp was a youth international for Japan before switching to represent Germany.

Career
Appelkamp made his professional debut for Fortuna Düsseldorf in the 2. Bundesliga on 26 September 2020, coming on as a substitute in 62nd minute of the team's 1–0 home win against Würzburger Kickers.

International career
Appelkamp was born in Japan to a German father and Japanese mother. He was a youth international for Japan, switching to Germany in 2021.

References

External links
 
 
 
 

2000 births
Living people
Association football people from Tokyo
German footballers
Japanese footballers
Japan youth international footballers
Germany under-21 international footballers
German people of Japanese descent
Japanese people of German descent
Citizens of Germany through descent
Association football midfielders
Fortuna Düsseldorf II players
Fortuna Düsseldorf players
2. Bundesliga players
Regionalliga players